Methanothermococcus okinawensis is a thermophilic, methane-producing archaeon first isolated from deep-sea hydrothermal vent on the western Pacific Ocean. Its cells are highly motile, irregular cocci, with a polar bundle of flagella. Its type strain is IH1T (=JCM 11175T =DSM 14208T).  It grows at an optimal temperature of 60–65 °C and pH of 6.7. It is strictly anaerobic and reduces carbon dioxide with hydrogen to produce methane, but it can also use formate. Research studies indicate that it might be able to survive extreme conditions in solar system's other bodies, such as Saturn's moon Enceladus.

See also
 Methanogens

References

Further reading

External links

LPSN
Type strain of Methanothermococcus okinawensis at BacDive -  the Bacterial Diversity Metadatabase

Archaea described in 2002
Euryarchaeota